Summers is a surname, and may refer to the following people:

People

In academia
 Clyde Summers (1918–2010), American labor lawyer and law professor at the University of Pennsylvania Law School
 David Summers (art historian), American art historian
 Harry G. Summers, Jr. (1932–1999), American army Colonel and author about the Vietnam War
 Lawrence Summers (born 1954), American economist and former president of Harvard University
 Max D. Summers (born 1939), American molecular biologist
 Robert Summers (born 1922), American economist
 Robert S. Summers (born 1933), American academic
Vera Summers (born 1899), Australian high school teacher and principal

In arts and entertainment

Music
 Andrew Rowan Summers (1912–1968), American folk singer
 Andy Summers (born 1942), English guitarist
 Bill Summers (musician) (born 1948), American jazz percussionist
 David Summers Rodríguez, Spanish musician and frontman of Hombres G
 Gene Summers (born 1939), American recording artist
 Isabella Summers (born 1980), British musician
 John "Dick" Summers (1887–1976), fiddler from Indiana
 Steve Summers, lead singer of the band Pretty Boy Floyd

Other arts
 Barbara Summers
 Dylan Summers (born 1973), American professional wrestler better known as Necro Butcher
 Henry Summers (actor), pseudonym used by Ed Wynn
 Hope Summers (1896–1979), American actress
 Jackie Summers, food writer
 Jeremy Summers (born 1931), British film director
 Marc Summers (born 1951), American television personality
 Montague Summers (1880–1948), English author and clergyman
 Robert Summers (artist) (born 1940), American painter and sculptor

In government and politics
Amy Summers (born 1963), American state representative from West Virginia
David Summers (diplomat), Canadian High Commissioner to Malaysia
 George W. Summers (1804–1868), American politician
 Glenn E. Summers (1925–2020), American lawyer, judge, and politician
 Henry Summers (civil servant)
 John W. Summers (1870–1937), American politician
 John Summers (Tennessee politician) from Metropolitan Council

In sport
 Bill Summers (umpire) (1895–1966), American umpire
 Champ Summers (born 1946), American baseball player
 DaJuan Summers ( born 1988), American Basketball Player
 Ed Summers (1884–1953), American baseball player
 Freddie Summers (born 1947), American football player
 Jamar Summers (born 1995), American football player
 John Summers (figure skater) (born 1957), American ice dancer
 John Summers (footballer) (1915–1991), English footballer
 John Summers (sport shooter), Australian Olympic sport shooter
 John Summers (curler) in the 2011 World Senior Curling Championships – Men's tournament
 Johnny Summers (footballer) (1927–1962), footballer for Charlton Athletic
 Johnny Summers (boxer) (1882–1946), English boxer
 Richard Summers (1860–1941), Wales rugby union international
 Sheila Piercey (born 1919), South African tennis player
 Ty Summers (born 1996), American football player

In other fields
 Bill Summers (car builder) (1935–2011), American car builder and longtime speed record holder
 Bill Summers (jeweller), predecessor of David V. Thomas as British crown jeweller
 John Summers & Sons, UK steel and iron producers
 John Summers (RAF officer) (1894–?), World War I flying ace
 Joseph Summers (1904–1954), British test pilot
 Montague Summers (1880–1948), English author and clergyman
 Sarah Rose Summers (born 1994), American beauty pageant titleholder and Miss USA 2018
 Vera Summers (born 1899), Australian high school teacher and principal

Fictional characters 
 Lenny Summers, character from Red Dead Redemption 2
 Mary Ann Summers, castaway on the television series Gilligan's Island

Buffy the Vampire Slayer
 Buffy Summers, central character of the film and television series, Buffy the Vampire Slayer
 Dawn Summers, Buffy's sister
 Hank Summers, father of Buffy and Dawn Summers
 Joyce Summers, mother of Buffy and Dawn Summers

Marvel Comics
 Alex Summers, Havok of the X-Men
 Christopher Summers, Corsair, father of Scott, Alex and Gabriel Summers, former leader of the Starjammers
 Gabriel Summers, Vulcan, X-Man turned supervillain
 Hope Summers (comics), first mutant born after M-Day
 Jean Grey-Summers, Phoenix of the X-Men
 Nathan Christopher Charles Summers, Cable of the X-Men
 Rachel Summers, Marvel Girl of the X-Men and Excalibur
 Ruby Summers, daughter of Scott Summers and Emma Frost
 Scott Summers, Cyclops, leader of the X-Men

See also 
 Ann Summers, a British retail chain of sex toys and lingerie
 Henry Summers (disambiguation)
 Sommers (surname)
 Sumners, surname

English-language surnames